Ten Thousand Ripples (TTR) is a collaborative public art, civic engagement and peace project.  It uses art as a catalyst to foster dialogue about peace and non-violence, and create innovative solutions to address contemporary social issues.  Through TTR, artists, neighborhood leaders, and residents are at the heart of community-driven planning and public involvement efforts.  At the center of TTR are 100 fiberglass and resin Buddha sculptures, each weighed down with a few hundred pounds of concrete, designed by Indira Johnson and installed in sites in 10 Chicago area neighborhoods.

The Project Idea 
Ambitious in its breadth, and bold in its objectives, Ten Thousand Ripples (TTR) is rooted in the belief that art is for people, that community art should contribute to daily life, and that the arts have the power to activate civic engagement, ignite creative ambitions, and foster safe forums for residents to talk.  These initial beliefs led artists, arts- and community-based organizations, and leaders from across Chicago to envision, support, and advance TTR in their studios, organizations, neighborhoods, and lives. Through this project, community conversations emerged, new partnerships were formed, access to the arts was increased, and a foundation for trust and mutual understanding was cultivated.

TTR is a partnership between artist Indira Johnson and Changing Worlds, an educational arts nonprofit.  Guided by a city-wide advisory council, TTR uses an innovative approach that engages entire communities and brings together people from various sectors in pursuit of transformational, sustainable change.  TTR is rooted in the beliefs that art is for the people, that community art should contribute to daily life, and that creating safe forums for residents to talk creates a habit of dialogue and a foundation for trust and mutual understanding. When these elements are in place, communities come together and quality of life is raised. TTR aims to leverage public art as a springboard to build responses and solutions to vital social concerns and to improve neighborhoods.  Each community brings its distinctive approach to TTR, and community engagement is the key to the project. While communities were different in composition and dynamics, each had vibrant local organizations that embraced this activist art project as a demonstration of their vision and commitment, especially while many faced chronic underfunding and understaffing. The common threads in all neighborhoods included locally based dialogues sessions, artistic programming, the installation of public art and arts infused community development plans.

Background 
The idea for TTR was formed over five years ago, when artist Indira Johnson had an exhibit of emerging Buddha sculptures on display at the Chicago Cultural Center.  She noticed visitors contemplating the sculptures—many even told her that they felt a sense of peace. For Johnson, who had used the emerging Buddha image for over a decade as a symbol of peace and self-realization, this response resonated.  Johnson wondered what reaction the sculptures would provoke if they were located in public spaces, like storefronts or abandoned lots. This thought led to the development of TTR.

In 2010, a leading grant from the Richard H. Driehaus Foundation helped seed the project’s development and launch a planning process to explore how this inspiring sculpture could impact public spaces and communities.  The actual production of the heads was funded by start-up money from local foundations, and local communities help fund their installation. While the image of the Buddha is a symbol of peace for Johnson, it is a surprising and sometimes provocative one for others, especially when seen on city streets.  The planning process began with Johnson inviting leaders from arts, social service, community, and educational institutions to form an Advisory Council to help shape the TTR project.  In addition, Johnson solicited input from residents of each area on where to place the Buddhas, and further encouraged community groups to start discussions around a theme related to peace.  In 2011, Changing Worlds partnered with Johnson to serve as the project’s lead agency.  Through planning retreats, Changing Worlds and its partners developed goals and objectives for the project, established a framework for community engagement, and adopted a set of desired outcomes and elements across partnering communities.  From the onset, a central goal of the initiative was to bring public art to neighborhoods across the city.

As community partnerships were solidified, TTR transitioned from centralized planning to community-based planning and engagement. Planning included research and conversations with both secular and faith-based leaders. This process took on different shapes per community, but across the board it included community forums, installation site recommendations, artistic programming ideas, resource leveraging, and implementation timelines. Over the period of three to four months, hundreds of residents were engaged in brainstorming sessions, community forums, and community arts planning. The process transformed everyday citizens into ambassadors of peace, arts, and culture. Each neighborhood received ten sculptures, which they installed in sites chosen by their residents. Despite these differences, the common element was using the image as a creative catalyst to bring people together to engage in conversations about contemporary social issues, promote peace, ignite new ideas for artistic and community programming, and coalesce entities that would not have otherwise come together.

Current Project 
By the spring of 2013, 100 Buddha heads existed, 10 in each of the following neighborhoods: Albany Park, Pilsen, Rogers Park, South Chicago, Uptown, North Lawndale, Little Village, Auburn Gresham, Back of the Yards and Evanston.  Past public art projects are placed in downtown Chicago or along Michigan Avenue, whereas these Buddha heads are strategically placed in high-crime and high-violence neighborhoods to spark reflection and conversation about violence prevention. TTR communities responded enthusiastically and imaginatively to the invitation to use the sculpture and artistic thinking to trigger creativity. For example, one community organized a Love Train for Peace parade; another offered a bike tour of local sculptures. Schools got involved, asking for sculptures to promote peace and incorporating TTR into art classes. Other communities used sculptures as stopping points in a peace procession or made plans to place them in vacant lots, creating Peace Parks. The hope was to change the way that the public interacts with art and the urban environment, because art is normally found only in a museum and these Buddha heads in urban areas changes one’s concept of public space.

During the late summer of 2013, five of the ten Buddha heads in each community became part of the exhibit at the Loyola University Museum of Art.  The exhibit displayed from July 20 until November 3, 2013, showcasing the community-building conversations and art projects that these sculptures helped spark. After the exhibit, the Buddha heads were sold to cover the remaining costs of the project as well support community arts programs.  Five Buddha heads remain in each community around Chicago to continue the conversations around peace and non-violence. In addition, a great diversity of people in communities from Albany Park to South Chicago have created works of art, dance, literature, film, and photography in response to this project.

Controversy 
Critics have argued the artist is merely "selling culture," a popular trend of cultural appropriation in today's global market. This work recalls popular initiatives such as Chicago's "Cows on Parade," albeit taking iconographic imagery from non-Western cultures and appropriating them [by Western audiences] into a commodity. Indira Johnson may have intended to use the Buddha image without religious connotation, but that is simply not possible just as the separation of a sculpture of Jesus Christ from Christianity is not possible. Depictions of the Buddha almost always include meaning or messages, identifiable by the mudra or even context within a jataka. Removing that meaning by removing the mudra violates the historic and religious significance of the Buddha image, further desecrating the religion. Johnson says the Buddha's head represents peace, which is not only inaccurate to the complex significance of his image, it also disregards Buddhism while reducing the concept and teachings of the Buddha to one idea - an ignorantly inaccurate idea. Had Johnson used the top half of Jesus Christ's head for this project, placing that head on the ground around Chicago, many speculate there would have been public outrage. Icons that were once popular in the U.S. are now becoming unacceptable, such as the University of Illinois's Chief Illini due to greater awareness and cultural understanding while others such as Ganesh or Tara are still being viewed as an exotic motif, as illustrated by this project.

References

Public art in the United States
Culture of Chicago